Pearl High Schools may refer to:

 Martin Luther King Magnet at Pearl High School (Nashville, Tennessee), listed on the National Register of Historic Places as Pearl High School
 Pearl Cohn Comprehensive High School (Nashville, Tennessee)
 Pearl High School (Mississippi) (Pearl, Mississippi)